Mahipatsinh Chavda (born 10 February 1967) is an Indian academic from Gujarat, India.

Early life and education
Mahipatsinh Chavda was born on 10 February 1967 to Ramuba and Dansinh Chavda in Pachhegam village (Bhavnagar). His family belongs to the  Kshatriya Karadia Rajputs.

Chavda received secondary and higher secondary education from Vallabhipur and then pursued a bachelor's degree (BA) in 1987 from Gujarat University, Ahmedabad. He obtained his master's degree (MA) and MPhil in Psychology from Sardar Patel University, Anand, in 1989 and 1990 respectively. He received his Doctorate degree (PhD) in Psychology in 2003 from Saurashtra University, Rajkot.

Career

Mr. Chavda serves as the Principal and Head of Department of L. D. Arts College and the coordinator Indira Gandhi National Open University and Babasaheb Ambedkar Open University, but is on an indefinite leave. During his tenure, the college received NAAC 'A' grade accreditation and stood among the top ranking arts colleges in India.

Along with academic experience of over 32 years, he has also served as dean (Faculty of Arts) and chairman (Board of Studies) at Gujarat University. Chavda has been an active academic senate and executive council member of several universities for over a decade.

He has been serving as panel member of various central & state government organizations, forums and committees including Presidential nominee committee(MHRD),UGC, NAAC, National forensic sciences laboratory & university, Madhya-Pradesh public service commission, Chhattisgarh public service commission, GPSC, Gaun Seva Pasandagi Mandal, IJIP, Indian  science congress etc. 

Chavda's areas of special expertise in teaching and research include Human Resource Development, Forensic Psychology and Social Psychology.

Vice chancellorship 

Chavda assumed charge as Vice Chancellor of Bhavnagar University in March 2019. Under his leadership, the university expanded its coverage in a sustainable way while enhancing equalities of access and outcomes, quality and relevance, and effective governance structures and management practices.

 Chavda has enriched the university's campus quality with several different academic programs, through best implementation of the visionary recommendations of NAAC and other eminent experts; resulting in drastic improvement of university's gradation in GSIRF rankings’21.

Research experience 

He has contributed to over 60 National and International research papers, publications, and over 15 books in Psychology.

Being an active educationist, he has delivered lectures and had academic interactions in various foreign countries and also supervised scholars for their Ph.D. Degrees including 150+ PG research projects.

References

External links

Academic staff of Indira Gandhi National Open University
Indian psychologists
Indian academic administrators
Living people
1967 births
Gujarat University alumni
People from Bhavnagar district
Academic staff of Dr. Babasaheb Ambedkar Open University